Márton Rátkai (born Mór Márton Fischer; 18 November 1881 – 18 September 1951) was a Hungarian actor and comedian. He was awarded the Kossuth Prize in 1949.

Selected filmography
 Captive Souls (1913)
 St. Peter's Umbrella (1917)
 Harrison and Barrison (1917)
 White Rose (1919)
 Búzavirág (1934)
 St. Peter's Umbrella (1935)
 Gül Baba (1940)

Bibliography
 Kulik, Karol. Alexander Korda: The Man Who Could Work Miracles. Virgin Books, 1990.

External links

1881 births
1951 deaths
Hungarian male film actors
Hungarian male silent film actors
20th-century Hungarian male actors
Hungarian male stage actors
Hungarian comedians
Male actors from Budapest
20th-century comedians